Iwanowski is a Polish coat of arms. It was used by the Iwanowski szlachta family.

History

Blazon

See also
 Polish heraldry
 Heraldic family
 List of Polish nobility coats of arms

Related coat of arms 
 Rogala coat of arms
 Hodyc coat of arms

Sources 
 Dynastic Genealogy 

Polish coats of arms